Angus Daniel Campbell (March 19, 1884 – March 5, 1976) was the founder of the Northern Ontario Hockey Association (NOHA), an executive member of the Ontario Hockey Association (OHA) and a member of the Hockey Hall of Fame.

Biography
Professionally, Campbell was a successful engineer for McIntyre-Porcupine Mines Ltd. and other companies.  He served a term as president of the Professional Engineers of Ontario.  After his retirement, he moved to Toronto, Ontario.  He died in 1976.

References

External links
 

1884 births
1976 deaths
Canadian ice hockey players
Cobalt Silver Kings players
Hockey Hall of Fame inductees
ice hockey people from Ontario
people from Cobalt, Ontario